Naval co-operation and guidance for shipping (NCAGS) is a naval doctrinal term. Naval personnel are trained to carry out NCAGS establish and provide advice for safe passage of merchant ships worldwide, during times of peace, tension, crisis and war. NCAGS personnel act as a liaison between military commanders and the civil authorities. During war, the NCAGS organization may be responsible for establishing a convoy. NCAGS is used by many NATO countries during exercises such as Bell Buoy. NCAGS has been an important part of the naval reserves.

Previously the doctrinal term used was 'naval control of shipping.'

NCAGS is often a joint effort between countries, and NATO maintains a dedicated NCAGS presence at the NATO Shipping Centre, part of Allied Maritime Command in Northwood, UK. It conducts multinational exercises to strengthen ties between national navies and the civilian shipping industry. 

NCAGS exercises such as Exercise Lucky Mariner test NCAGS skills.

NCAGS can sometimes be confused with Allied Worldwide Navigational Information System (AWNIS), which is a completely different set of skills in this area.

United Kingdom Maritime Trade Operations
After 2001, the UK Royal Navy created a naval reserve–manned UK Maritime Trade Operations (UK MTO) office in Dubai to coordinate and exchange information with merchant traffic in the Arabian Sea to help counter Somali piracy. It acts as the primary point of contact for merchant ships to connect and liaison with military forces in the Arabian Sea, Red Sea and Persian Gulf. The Maritime Trade Information Centre (MTIC) located in Portsmouth, UK supports UKMTO outputs.

NCAGS in the US Navy 
In the US Navy, NCAGS is a function that is staffed by the Navy Reserve. As of 2018, it is composed of:

 NCAGS Norfolk supporting US Fleet Forces
 NCAGS San Diego supporting US Third Fleet
 NCAGS Houston supporting US Fourth Fleet
 NCAGS Chicago supporting US Fifth Fleet
 NCAGS New York supporting US Sixth Fleet
 NCAGS Kitsap supporting US Seventh Fleet

References

External links
 NATO Shipping Centre
 PACIO Shipping Working Group

Ship management
United States Department of Defense doctrine